Derek L. G. Hill is professor of medical imaging at University College London (UCL).

He earned a B. Sc. (physics) from Imperial College London in 1987, an M. Sc. degree (medical physics) from the University of Surrey in 1989, and a Ph.D. from the United Medical and Dental Schools of Guy's and St Thomas' Hospitals (UMDS), University of London, in 1994.

Selected publications
 Combination of 3D medical images from multiple modalities. University of London, London, 1994.

References

External links 
https://www.researchgate.net/profile/Derek_Hill2
https://www.semanticscholar.org/author/Derek-L.-G.-Hill/144159315

Living people
Year of birth missing (living people)
Academics of University College London
Alumni of Imperial College London
Alumni of the University of Surrey
Alumni of the University of London